Sergey Aleksandrovich Ustiugov (born 8 April 1992) is a Russian cross-country skier, Olympic champion, world champion and Tour de Ski winner.

Career

Early career
In 2001, Sergey Ustiugov started practicing cross-country skiing in the biathlon section of the sports school of Mezhdurechensky. His head coach was Ivan Gennadievich Vragin.

Ten years later he won gold in sprint at the World Youth Cross-Country Skiing Championships in Otepää, Estonia. A year later he became four-times champion of the Youth Championships in Erzurum, Turkey, in sprint, 10 km race, skiatlon and relay. In 2013, he participated at the Junior Championships in Liberec, Czech Republic in the Under-23 classification, winning two gold medals in 15 km free style and 30 km skiatlon. At the 2014 Junior Championships in Val di Fiemme he won gold in individual sprint.

2011–15: World Cup debut and new coaching staff
Ustiugov debuted on 6 February 2011 at the World Cup in the relay event.

At the FIS Nordic World Ski Championships 2013 in Vale di Flemme, Ustiugov and his relay team claimed the bronze medal. However, in the individual 15 km freestyle race, he finished 47th. In the same year, he reached a podium place for the first time in Davos on 15 December, finishing third in the freestyle sprint. The following month he won a stage in the Czech Nové Město in the freestyle sprint. He debuted at the 2014 Winter Olympics in sprint, where he finished fifth after falling near the final passage. In May 2014, Ustiugov switched his coach Oleg Perevozchikov in favor of the Swiss-German duo Reto Burgermeister/Isabel Knaute.

2015–17: Tour de Ski champion, world champion
In the 2015–16 WC season, in January 2015, he and Alexey Petukhov won the team sprint event at a World Cup stage in Otepää. In Rybinsk, he finished second in freestyle sprint and third in individual 15 km freestyle. He participated at the 2016 Tour de Ski, reaching third place overall. In the Nove Mesto stage, he won silver and bronze in the 15 km freestyle and relay event, subsequently. In February, he won the mass start 15 km free style event in Swedish Falun. At the season-ending Ski Tour Canada, he clinched second place overall, reaching five times the pedestal.

In October, Ustyugov and other skiers, including Evgeny Belov and Stanislav Volzhentsev, conflicted with Burgermeister-Knaute, leading to the President of the Russian Federation of Cross-Country Skiing and main coach of the Russian national team Elena Vyalbe allowing him to switch the coaching group; German Markus Kramer, who previously coached 2014 Olympic Champion Alexander Legkov among others, was chosen as the new head coach for Ustiugov.

In the new season, Ustiugov won the 2016-17 Tour de Ski in January. He then went on to win five stages, only losing in the 6th. In the last stage, the final climb, he started first and, by saving the handicap, won the overall tour. He was the second Russian since Legkov to win the Tour de Ski. Ustiugov also set a record for the most wins in succession (5). Before him, the record was four winning stages in a row, set by Johnsrud Sundby.

He started the 2017 FIS Nordic World Ski Championships by winning the silver medal in the sprint competition. Then he went on winning his first ever gold medal at the Championships in 30 km skiathlon. With Nikita Kriukov he won his second gold medal in the team sprint.

After the Championships, Ustiugov took another spot on the podium in Drammen after finishing third in the final in the classical sprint. Overall, he finished the season second after Johnsrud Sundby.

2017–18: Steadiness and Decline
Ustiugov did not start well in the next season, finishing 23rd in the Ruka Triple. However, between the Ruka Triple and the Tour de Ski, he rebounded and finished three times as runner-up in three different disciplines (sprint, individual, and pursuit). At first, he started well to defend the Tour de Ski title after he finished first, tenth, and second in Lenzerheide, in the sprint, individual, and pursuit, respectively, but beginning with the next stage he always finished beyond the top-10 position, and in the pursuit climb he did not participate, leaving him without a place in the overall tour ranking; during the mass start stage in Val di Fiemme he finished with pain in the back and so could not participate in the deciding stage.

Amidst the doping accusations, several clean athletes, including Ustiugov, An and Shipulin, were not invited by the International Olympic Committee (IOC) to participate at the 2018 Winter Olympics, including Ustiugov. Prior to the Olympics, Ustiugov participated at the 50 km marathon event of the Ski Classics series in Cortina d'Ampezzo, finishing third. After his appeal and that of 46 other athletes to the Court of Arbitration for Sport were declined, Ustiugov participated at the Russian Cup created by the Russian government for athletes who were banned by the IOC and won the team sprint with Alexander Legkov. He skipped the remaining stages that season.

2018–19: Comeback
On 23 October 2018, Ustiugov injured his finger during practice in Val Senales with roller skis. Eight days later, he was successfully operated in Moscow. He returned to practice on 4 November, and on 16 December he came back to sports in Davos, in the eighth stage of the new FIS World Cup season. Ustiugov finished 25th.

In the 13th edition of the Tour de Ski, Ustiugov won the second stage in 15 km individual freestyle, exactly a year after his last victory. After finishing third, third, and second in Sprint F, 15 km C Mass Start and 15 km C Pursuit, respectively, Ustiugov failed in Stage 6, 15 km C Mass Start in Val di Fiemme. In the third-last round, he got tired and fell behind the leaders, with his teammates Sobakarev, Larkov, and Vylegzhanin taking the lead. The Russians were outskated by Klaebo and De Fabiani before the finish line. Ustiugov finished 16th. In the last pursuit climb stage, he rebounded and won over a minute, almost reaching exhausted Klaebo after showing strong climb performance. As a result, he finished 2nd in the overall classification.

Ustiugov finished the season at the World Ski Championships, during which he received problems with his gallbladders.

2020–21: COVID-19 infection and recovery
Ustiugov tested positive for COVID-19 in October 2020 during practice in Italian Val Senales. He resumed practice in early December after slowly recovering from the infection. He returned competing in a national, non-World Cup event in Kirovo-Chepetsk in January 2021. In his first World Cup participation for a while, Ustiugov and his relay partners finished third in Lahti. While not winning a podium place this season, he qualified thrice to the sprint finals in Falun, Ulricehamn, and Oberstdorf.

Personal life
Sergey Ustiugov was born in Mezhdurechensky as one of the youngest children in a large family; he is of Mansi descent. He married junior cross-country ski champion Elena Soboleva on 9 August 2019. Their child, Kira, was born on 17 January 2020.

He is nicknamed "The Moose" (лось, los' ) by his fans.

Cross-country skiing results
All results are sourced from the International Ski Federation (FIS).

Olympic Games
 1 medal – (1 gold)

Distance reduced to 30 km due to weather conditions.

World Championships
 7 medals – (2 gold, 4 silver, 1 bronze)

World Cup

Season standings

Individual podiums
 15 victories – (4 , 11 ) 
 46 podiums – (21 , 25 )

Team podiums
 2 victories – (1 , 1 )
 7 podiums – (6 , 1 )

Notes

References

External links

1992 births
Living people
Cross-country skiers at the 2014 Winter Olympics
Cross-country skiers at the 2022 Winter Olympics
Russian male cross-country skiers
Olympic cross-country skiers of Russia
Medalists at the 2022 Winter Olympics
Olympic gold medalists for the Russian Olympic Committee athletes
Olympic medalists in cross-country skiing
Tour de Ski winners
Tour de Ski skiers
FIS Nordic World Ski Championships medalists in cross-country skiing
Mansi people